Karamoko Kéïta (born 21 September 1974) is a Malian former international footballer who played as a goalkeeper.

Career
Kéïta played club football for FCM Garges-lès-Gonesse, Yeading, Wembley, Harrow Borough, Hayes, Northwood and Wealdstone. He combined his playing career with a job in the pharmaceutical industry.

He represented Mali at international level at the 1994 African Cup of Nations and 2002 African Cup of Nations tournaments.

References

1974 births
Living people
Malian footballers
Mali international footballers
Yeading F.C. players
Wembley F.C. players
Harrow Borough F.C. players
Northwood F.C. players
Hayes F.C. players
Wealdstone F.C. players
Isthmian League players
1994 African Cup of Nations players
2002 African Cup of Nations players
Association football goalkeepers
Malian expatriate footballers
Malian expatriate sportspeople in France
Expatriate footballers in France
Malian expatriate sportspeople in England
Expatriate footballers in England
21st-century Malian people